Cambrose is a hamlet east of Portreath in west Cornwall, England, UK.

Cambrose is the location of Sally's Bottom, a small valley running down to the coast.

References 

Hamlets in Cornwall